The Blue Flag is a certification by the Foundation for Environmental Education (FEE) that a beach, marina, or sustainable boating tourism operator meets its standards.
The Blue Flag is a trademark owned by FEE, which is a not-for-profit non-governmental organisation consisting of 65 organisations in 77 member countries.

FEE's Blue Flag criteria include standards for quality, safety, environmental education and information, the provision of services and general environmental management criteria. The Blue Flag is sought for beaches, marinas, and sustainable boating tourism operators as an indication of their high environmental and quality standards.

Certificates, which FEE refers to as awards, are issued on an annual basis to beaches and marinas of FEE member countries. The awards are announced yearly on 5 June for Europe, Canada, Morocco, Tunisia, and other countries in a similar geographic location, and on 1 November for the Caribbean, New Zealand, South Africa, and other countries in the southern hemisphere.

In the European Union, the water quality standards are incorporated in the EC Water Framework Directive.

As of 2016 Spain has had more blue flag beaches than any other country every year since the awards began in 1987.

Blue Flags awarded

2015 Awards 
As a result of the 2015 awards, a total of 4,154 Blue Flags are waving around the world.

Table of Blue Flags in force 2015
The table below lists the Blue Flags (both for beaches and marinas) awarded and in force in 2015.

The table can be sorted to show the total number of Blue Flags per country and also the number of Blue Flags per population, per area or per the length of the coastline of each country.

Notes: Wales, Scotland, England and Northern Ireland have always been treated as individual countries e.g. in 2015 Northern Ireland had 10 Blue Flag beaches and marinas, England had 61, Wales had 41 and Scotland 1.
As of 2016 Spain has had more blue flag beaches than any other country every year since the awards began in 1987.

History
The Blue Flag was created in France in 1985, as a pilot scheme from the Office of the Foundation for Environmental Education in Europe (Office français de la Fondation pour l'Education à l'Environnement en Europe) where French coastal municipalities were awarded the Blue Flag on the basis of criteria covering sewage treatment and bathing water quality. 11 French municipalities got the award in 1985.

Blue Flag on European Community level in 1987
1987 was the "European Year of the Environment" and the European Commission was responsible for developing the European Community activities of that year. The Foundation for Environmental Education in Europe (FEEE) presented the concept of the Blue Flag to the commission, and it was agreed to launch the Blue Flag Programme as one of several "European Year of the Environment" activities in the Community.

The French concept of the Blue Flag was developed on European level to include other areas of environmental management, such as waste management and coastal planning and protection. Besides beaches marinas also became eligible for the Blue Flag.

In 1987, 244 beaches and 208 marinas from 10 countries were awarded the Blue Flag.

Success
There have been increases in the numbers of Blue Flags awarded each year. The criteria have during these years been changed to more strict criteria. As an example, in 1992 the Programme started using the restrictive guideline values in the EEC Bathing Water Directive as imperative criteria, and this was also the year where all Blue Flag criteria became the same in all participating countries.

Outside the European Union
In 2001, FEEE rules were changed to allow non-European national organisations, sharing the objectives of FEEE, to become members, and changed its name by dropping Europe from its name, becoming the Foundation for Environmental Education (FEE).

Several organisations and authorities outside the European Union have joined FEE. In 2001, South Africa and several Caribbean countries joined. FEE has been cooperating with UNEP and UN WTO on extending the Programme to areas outside Europe. South Africa, Canada, Morocco, Tunisia, New Zealand and four countries in the Caribbean region are members of FEE. Aruba and Brazil are currently in the pilot phase of the Programme and Jordan, Macedonia, Turks & Caicos Islands, Ukraine and United Arab Emirates have started the implementation of the Blue Flag Programme.

FEE standards allow for regional variations in beach criteria to reflect specific environmental conditions of a region. As of 2006 an international set of criteria is being used with some variations.

Extension of the award to sustainable boating tourism operators 
In 2016, Blue Flag extended its programme boat-based tourism activities like nature watching (whale watching, bird watching, cage diving etc.), recreational fishing, diving and crewed charter tours. Certified tour operators have to comply with criteria regarding the sustainable operation of their boats and their business as a whole.

Present program
In 2015 over 4,154 beaches and marinas globally were awarded the Blue Flag.

47 countries are participating in the Blue Flag Programme: Bahamas, Belgium, Brazil, Bulgaria, Canada, Costa Rica, Croatia, Cyprus, Denmark, Dominican Republic, England, Estonia, France, Germany, Greece, Iceland, India, Ireland, Israel, Italy, Jordan, Latvia, Lithuania, Malta, Mexico, Montenegro, Morocco, Netherlands, New Zealand, Northern Ireland, Norway, Panama, Poland, Portugal, Puerto Rico, Romania, Serbia, Sint Marteen, Scotland, Slovenia, South Africa, Spain, Sweden, Tunisia, Trinidad and Tobago, Turkey, United Arab Emirates, Ukraine, US Virgin Islands and Wales.

Blue Flag beach criteria

Environmental education and information
Information relating to coastal zone ecosystems and natural, sensitive areas in the coastal zone must be displayed
Information about bathing water quality must be displayed
Information about the Blue Flag Programme must be displayed
Code of conduct for the beach area must be displayed and the laws governing beach use must be easily available to the public upon request
A minimum of 5 environmental education activities must be offered

Water quality
Compliance with the requirements and standards for excellent bathing water quality
No industrial or sewage related discharges may affect the beach area
Monitoring on the health of coral reefs located in the vicinity of the beach
Compliance of the community with requirements for sewage treatment and effluent quality
Algae or other vegetation should be left to decay on the beach unless it constitutes a nuisance

Environmental management
A beach management committee must be established to be in charge of instituting environmental management systems and conduct regular environmental audits of the beach facility
The beach must comply with all regulations affecting the location and operation of the beach (coastal zone planning and environmental legislation)
The beach must be clean
Waste disposal bins/receptacles must be available on/by the beach in adequate numbers, regularly maintained and emptied
Facilities for receiving recyclable waste materials must be available on/by the beach
Adequate and clean sanitary facilities with controlled sewage disposal
On the beach there will be no unauthorised camping or driving and no dumping
Regulation concerning dogs and other domestic animals on the beach must be strictly enforced
All buildings and equipment of the beach must be properly maintained
Sustainable means of transportation must be promoted in the beach area

Safety and services
An adequate number of lifeguards and/or lifesaving equipment must be available at the beach
First aid equipment must be available on the beach
There must be management of different users and uses of the beach so as to prevent conflicts and accidents
An emergency plan to cope with pollution safety risks must be in place
There must be safe access to the beach
The beach area must be patrolled
A supply of drinking water must be available on the beach
A minimum of one Blue Flag beach in each municipality must have access and toilet facilities provided for disabled persons
A map of the beach indicating different facilities must be displayed

Blue Flag marina criteria

Environmental education and information 

Environmental information about natural sensitive nearby land and marine areas is supplied to marina users.
Code of environmental conduct is posted in the marina.
Information about the Blue Flag Marina Programme and/or the Blue Flag Marina Criteria are posted in the marina.
The marina should be able to demonstrate that at least three environmental education activities are offered to the users and staff of the marina
The Individual Blue Flag for boat owners is offered through the marina.

Environmental management
Production of an environmental policy and plan at the marina. The plan should include references to water, waste and energy consumption, health and safety issues, and the use of environmentally sound products when available.
Adequate and properly identified and segregated containers for the storage of hazardous wastes (paints, solvents, boat scrapings, antifouling agents, batteries, waste oil, flares). The wastes should be handled by a licensed contractor and disposed of at a licensed facility for hazardous waste.
Adequate and well managed litter bins and/or garbage containers. The wastes should be handled by a licensed contractor and disposed of by a licensed facility.
The marina has facilities for receiving recyclable waste materials, such as bottles, cans, paper, plastic, organic material, etc.
Bilge water pumping facilities are present in the marina.
Toilet pumping facilities are present in the marina.
All buildings and equipment must be properly maintained and in compliance with national legislation. The marina must be in a good integration with the surrounding natural and built environment.
Adequate, clean and well sign-posted sanitary facilities, including washing facilities and drinking water. Controlled sewage disposal to a licensed sewage treatment.
If the marina has boat repairing and washing areas, no pollution must enter the sewage system, marina land and water or the natural surroundings.
Promotion of sustainable transportation.
No parking/driving in the marina, unless in specific designated areas.

Safety and service
Adequate, clean and well sign-posted lifesaving, first-aid equipment and fire-fighting equipment. Equipment must be approved by national authorities.
Emergency plan in case of pollution, fire or other accidents must be produced.
Safety precautions and information must be posted at the marina.
Electricity and water is available at the berths, installations must be approved according to national legislation.
Facilities for disabled people.
Map indicating the location of the different facilities is posted at the marina.

Water quality
Visually clean water (no oil, litter, sewage or other evidence of pollution).
Microbiological test as evidence for bacterial free

Blue Flag sustainable boating tourism operator criteria

Environmental education and information 
 Information to relevant local environmental phenomena, local ecosystems and sensitive areas in the surrounding environment
 Information about the Blue Flag programme
 Code of conduct for passengers which includes the adequate disposal of litter, smoking policy on board, safety measures and the adequate behaviour during an encounter with wild animals
 At least one environmental education activity has to be offered within the operating season
 Environmental training for all employees
 Provision of a qualified guide on guided tours

Environmental management 
 It is recommended to establish a management committee with responsibility for instituting environmental management systems and conducting regular environmental audits
 Each tour operator has to have an environmental policy and an environmental plan
 All regulations pertaining to the location and the operation of the boats have to be complied with
 Use of adequate, properly identified and segregated containers for the storage of hazardous wastes 
 Use of adequate litter bins, including recycling bins
 Correct disposal of all wastes produced by the tourists and the tour operator
 Use of recyclable products, biodegradable materials and environmentally friendly toiletries and cleaning products
 Smoking should be prohibited on the boats
 Correct treatment of bilge water
 Provision of adequate sanitary facilities with correct sewage disposal
 Repair and paint works on the boats must be limited to specifically designated areas
 Promotion of sustainable means of transportation from and to the boats
 Report of accidents that might cause environmental damages
 Speed and engine maintenance of the boats must be aimed at maximising energy efficiency and minimising pollution
 Environmentally friendly anchoring 
 Correct disposal of boats that have reached the end of their life service

Safety and services 
 Provision of adequate and well-signposted lifesaving, first-aid and fire-fighting equipment which has been approved by relevant national authorities
 Provision of emergency plans for different possible kinds of accidents and regular emergency trainings for the crew
 Safety precautions and information must be presented on the boat
 Facilities for people with disabilities should be in place
 Adequate signage indicating the location of the different facilities on the boats

Social responsibility 
 Discrimination based on gender, sexual orientation, disabilities, origin or religious affiliation should not be accepted within the tour operator
 Payment of fair salaries according to the respective income level in the country
 The legal working age in the respective country should be respected
 The tour operator should support the local economy by choosing to buy and use local products

Responsible tourism 
 Vulnerable and protected areas must be respected
 Any wildlife must be approached at a slow speed and in a manner that allows the animal(s) to evaluate the situation. They must not be encircled, trapped or chased
 Special precaution must be taken in the vicinity of breeding animals. Young animals must not be separated from their group
 When in the direct vicinity of any wildlife, noise must be reduced to a minimum and the engine should be put into neutral whenever appropriate
 No animals or plants are to be touched or collected
 Tourists and employees must not feed the animals
 If there are any signs of disturbance, the boat must increase its distance from the animals
 The tour operator should be open to cooperation with research institutions. The company's vessel might function as a research platform, and collected data of wildlife sightings should be made available to researchers
 Injured, entangled, stranded or dead animals must be reported to the local authorities

Additional criteria for specific wildlife-based activities 
The criteria presented above apply to all tour operators that want to be awarded the Blue Flag. In addition, tour operators that offer whale watching, bird watching, seal watching, cage diving, recreational fishing and diving have to comply with additional criteria for the respective activity. These criteria are tailored to the different tourist experiences and take into account the specific environmental issues related to them. They include for example approach distances to different animal species, the correct use of equipment and the humane handling of animals that are caught during recreational fishing tours.

References

External links

 
 Blue Flag Beaches in South East England, official tourist information
 current UK blue flag beaches list

Water and the environment
Environmental standards
Beaches
International standards
Environmental certification marks
Blue Flag beaches